Excidobates captivus, the Santiago poison frog or Rio Santiago poison frog, is a species of frog in the family Dendrobatidae. It is endemic to northwestern Peru and southern Ecuador. Its natural habitat is tropical moist lowland forests. This frog is black with rows of orange-red spots on its back and yellow spots underneath.

Description
It is black with orange-red splotches arranged in a row down either side of the back. It also has small yellow spots above the armpit and groin and further pale yellow spots beneath the chin and scattered on the chest and belly and under the thighs. The first finger of the forelimb is considerably shorter than the second finger.

Distribution
It was rediscovered in the same locality some seventy-seven years later and a single specimen has also been observed on the north side of the Marañón River. The habitat is wet parts of primary forest and areas close to streams.

Biology
Excidobates captivus is a diurnal, terrestrial frog. In the breeding season, the male advertises his presence by calling from hidden positions among low foliage, emitting short "shrieks" at irregular intervals. The eggs may be laid on the forest floor among leaf litter. The tadpoles are transported on the parent's back to phytotelmata, temporary pools of water, and may be deposited in the axils of Heliconia plants.

Status
Excidobates captivus has been little studied but the remote terrain in which it is found means that its habitat is little disturbed. There is some small-scale gold-mining in the area but it is not known whether this affects the frog, the population of which seems stable.

References

Amphibians described in 1982
captivus
Amphibians of Ecuador
Amphibians of Peru